Einar Skjæraasen (23 July 1900 – 18 March 1966) was a Norwegian author and poet, a longtime resident of Trysil.

He was a parliamentary ballot candidate for the Liberal Party from the constituency Oslo in 1957.

Bibliography
Reflekser (1936)
Skritt forbi min dør (1938)
Den underlige våren (1941)
Så stiger sevjene (1945)
Danse mi vise, gråte min sang (1949)
Du ska itte trø i graset (1954)
Sju undringens mil (Utvalgte dikt 1963)
Sang i September (1965)
Bumerke Etterlatte dikt (1966)

Awards
 Mads Wiel Nygaards Endowment in 1965

References 

Norwegian writers
1900 births
1966 deaths
People from Trysil
20th-century Norwegian poets
Norwegian male poets
20th-century Norwegian male writers